Sergey Perunin (born 19 July 1988) is a Russian swimmer who won a silver medal in the 4 × 200 m freestyle relay at the 2009 World Aquatics Championships. Next year he won a gold medal in the same event at the 2010 European Aquatics Championships setting a new European record.

In August 2012 he married Larisa Ilchenko, multiple open water swimming champion.

References

External links
 

1988 births
Living people
Russian male swimmers
Russian male freestyle swimmers
European Aquatics Championships medalists in swimming
World Aquatics Championships medalists in swimming
Universiade medalists in swimming
Universiade silver medalists for Russia
Universiade bronze medalists for Russia
Medalists at the 2007 Summer Universiade
Sportspeople from Volgograd